Vengeance is the fifth studio album by American rock band Nonpoint. It debuted No. 129 on the Billboard 200 charts.

The first single from the album, "March of War", was released via Nonpoint's MySpace page. The band shortly thereafter added a sample of the opening track off the album, "Wake Up World". A remix of the eleventh track from the album, titled "Everybody Down", is featured in the video game WWE Smackdown vs. Raw 2008.

Guitarist and founding member Andrew Goldman left Nonpoint nearly a year after this album's release.

Track listing

References

Nonpoint albums
2007 albums
Bieler Bros. Records albums